Born Into Struggle is a South African 2004 documentary film.

Synopsis 
In this documentary, the filmmaker Rehad Desai takes us on an intimate journey mapped out by the scars etched into his family's life from having a father who was intensely involved in politics. Barney Desai was a political activist during South Africa's struggle for freedom, yet as a father he was absent emotionally. Rehad spent most of his young life in exile and became politically active himself. On this intensely personal journey into his past, Rehad realizes he is following in his fathers footsteps as he reviews his relationship with his own estranged teenage son.

Festivals
The film had its world premiere as a work in progress on 28 April 2004 as part of "Ten Years Of Freedom - Films from the New South Africa," a festival held in New York City.

Awards 

 Encounters 2004
 Apollo 2004
Durban 2004
World Cinema Festival, Cape Town 2004
 African Film Festival of Cordoba

References

External links
 ucfilms

2004 films
South African documentary films
2004 documentary films
Documentary films about apartheid
Documentary films about families